Rederscheid is a village in the municipality of Windhagen in the district of Neuwied, Rhineland-Palatinate, Germany. The village has about 500 inhabitants in 100 households. Rederscheid was incorporated into Windhagen on November 8, 1970.

Villages in Rhineland-Palatinate